Magnus Erik Karlsson (born 28 December 1981) is a former motorcycle speedway rider from Sweden.

Family
His two older brothers, Peter Karlsson and Mikael Max are both former Speedway Grand Prix riders. All three brothers represented Sweden in the 2007 Speedway World Cup, with Magnus riding at reserve.

Career
Magnus had a successful start to his British career. He first rode in the Premier League in 2002 with the Edinburgh Monarchs and in 2003 he was part of the Premier League Championship winning team. In 2004, he moved on to the Hull Vikings, and was part of the team that won the League Championship, KO Cup and Young Shield treble. Magnus decided to join his brother Peter at Elite League Wolverhampton Wolves in 2005 where he recorded a 5.58 average in his debut season, including a paid maximum. In 2006 his average dropped to 4.71 and it dropped again in 2007 to 3.62, despite representing Sweden in the Speedway World Cup.

Magnus decided to drop down to the Premier League with Scunthorpe Scorpions in 2008 and produced his best-ever season at that level with the Scorpions in 2009.  He rode for the Lincolnshire club for a third consecutive season in 2010, before moving to Leicester Lions in 2011, initially on loan but later becoming a club asset. His final season with Leicester was in 2013 and his final season in Poland was with Wanda Kraków in 2014.

References

People from Gullspång Municipality
1981 births
Living people
Swedish speedway riders
Edinburgh Monarchs riders
Hull Vikings riders
Leicester Lions riders
Scunthorpe Scorpions riders
Wolverhampton Wolves riders
Sportspeople from Västra Götaland County